The machines participating in Grand Prix motorcycle racing, since its origin in 1949, have been entered into distinct classes depending primarily on engine capacity. The smallest engines and two-stroke engines have been phased out over the years.

MotoGP class

1000cc (2012–present)
 Aprilia RS-GP
 Ducati Desmosedici
 Honda RC213V
 Honda RCV1000R
 Honda RC213V-RS
 KTM RC16
 Suzuki GSX-RR
 Yamaha YZR-M1

800 cc (2007–2011)
 Ducati Desmosedici
 Honda RC212V
 Ilmor X3
 Kawasaki Ninja ZX-RR
 Suzuki GSV-R
 Team Roberts KR212V
 Yamaha YZR-M1

990 cc (2002–2006)
 Aprilia RS Cube
 Ducati Desmosedici
 Harris WCM
 Honda RC211V
 Kawasaki Ninja ZX-RR
 Moriwaki MD211VF
 Proton KR5
 Proton KTM
 Suzuki GSV-R
 Team Roberts KR211V
 Yamaha YZR-M1

500 cc class (1949–2002)
 Aermacchi Ala d'Oro 402
 AJS Porcupine
 Aprilia RSW-2 500
 BMW RS500 Type 255
 BSA Gold Star
 BSL 500 V3
 Cagiva 1C2
 Cagiva 2C2
 Cagiva 3C2
 Cagiva 4C3
 Cagiva C9
 Cagiva C10
 Cagiva C587
 Cagiva C588
 Cagiva C589
 Cagiva C590
 Cagiva C591
 Cagiva C592
 Cagiva C593
 Cagiva C594
 ČZ500 V4 Type 860
 
 ELF-Honda
 ELF 500 ROC

 Gilera 500 GP
 Gilera 4

 Harris-Yamaha
 Honda RC181
 Honda NR500
 Honda NS500
 Honda NSR500
 Honda NSR500V
 Honda NX500
 Honda RS500
 Horex 500
 Jawa Factory Racer
 Kawasaki H1A R
 Kawasaki H1R
 Kawasaki KR500
 LinTo 500 GP
 Matchless G50
 Modenas KR3
 Morbidelli 500
 Moto Guzzi 500 Four

 Moto Guzzi V8
 Muz 500
 MV Agusta 500 4C
 MV Agusta 500 Six
 MV Agusta 500 Three
 MV Agusta 500 Four
 Nougier 500
 Norton Manx
 Norton NRS588
 Paton 500 GP
 Paton V115
 Paton V70
 Paton PG500R
 Paton PG500RC
 Pulse 500
 ROC-Yamaha GP1
 Sabre V4
 Sanvenero 500 GP
 Seeley G50
 Suzuki TR500
 Suzuki TSR500
 Suzuki RG500
 Suzuki RGA500
 Suzuki RGB500
 Suzuki RG 500 gamma
 Suzuki RGV500
 TSR-Honda AC50M
 Velocette Thruxton
 Vincent Grey Flash
 Yamaha TZ500
 Yamaha YZR500

350 cc class (1949–1982)
 Aermacchi Ala d'Oro 350
 AJS 7R
 Bianchi 350
 ČZ 320 DOHC
 ČZ 350
 ČZ 350 V4
 Ducati 350 Desmo GP
 Harley-Davidson RR350
 Honda RC170
 Honda RC171
 Honda RC172
 Honda 2RC172
 Honda RC173
 Honda RC174
 Jawa 350 Twin
 Jawa 350 V4
 Kawasaki KR350
 MV Agusta 350 Twin
 MV Agusta 350 4C (1954–1964)
 MV Agusta 350 Six
 MV Agusta 350 3C
 MV Agusta 350 4C (1972–1976)
 MZ 350 Twin
 Norton Kneeler
 Yamaha 350 Triple
 Yamaha TZ 350
 Yamaha TR2
 Yamaha TR3
 Yamaha YZR350

Moto2 class (2010–present)

 AJR Moto2
 AJR EVO 2012
 ADV AT02
 Bimota HB4
 Boscoscuro B-22
 BQR-Moto2
 Force GP210
 Forward KLX
 FTR Moto M210
 FTR Moto M211
 FTR Moto M212
 FTR Moto M213
 Harris Moto2
 IAMT Moto2
 I.C.P. Textra
 Kalex Moto2
 KTM Moto2
 MIR Moto2
 Moriwaki MD600
 Motobi TSR6
 MV Agusta F2
 MZ Moto2
 NTS NH6
 RBB Moto2
 RSV Motor DR600
 Speed Up S12
 Speed Up SF13
 Speed Up SF14
 Suter MMX
 Suter MMX2
 Suter MMXI
 Suter MMXII
 TaylorMade Carbon 2
 Tech 3 Mistral 610
 Ten Kate Moto2
 TransFIORmers
 TSR TSR6

250 cc class (1949–2009)
 Aprilia AF1 250
 Aprilia RSV 250
 Aprilia RSW 250
 Aprilia RSA 250
 Benelli 250 DOHC
 Bianchi 250
 Bultaco 250
 ČZ 250
 Gilera 250
 Gilera GFR 250
 Harley-Davidson RR250
 Honda 220cc prototype (1954)
 Honda 250 6 Cyls
 Honda 250 4 Cyls
 Honda RC160
 Honda RC161
 Honda RC162
 Honda RC163
 Honda CR72
 Honda RC164
 Honda 3RC164
 Honda RC165
 Honda RC166
 Honda RS250R
 Honda RS250RW
 Honda NSR250
 Jawa 250 Single
 Jawa 250 Twin
 Kawasaki KR250
 KTM 250 FRR
 Motobi 250
 Moto Guzzi 250
 Moto Guzzi Albatross
 Moto Guzzi Gambalunghino

 Montesa 250
 Morbidelli 250
 MV Agusta 203 Bialbero
 MV Agusta 220 Bialbero
 MV Agusta 250 Monocilindrica Bialbero
 MV Agusta 250 Bicilindrica
 MZ RZ 250 Twin
 New Imperial 250
 Ossa 250
 Puch 250
 Rudge 250 Sports
 Suzuki 250 RGV-XR Twin
 Suzuki RGV250
 Villa 250
 Walter 250
 Yamaha YD1
 Yamaha RD48
 Yamaha RD56
 Yamaha 250 Twin
 Yamaha 250 V4
 Yamaha TZ 250
 Yamaha TZR250
 Yamaha YZR250

Moto3 class (2012–present)

 CFMoto Moto3
 EvL250
 FGR 250 GP
 FTR M312
 FTR M313
 FTR M314
 FTR M315
 GasGas RC250GP
 Honda NSF250R
 Honda NSF250RW
 Husqvarna FR250GP
 Ioda TR002
 Kalex KTM Moto3
 KRP M3-01
 KRP M3-02
 KTM RC250GP
 KTM RC250R
 Mahindra MGP3O
 MIR Racing Moto3
 Oral M3
 Peugeot MGP3O
 Suter MMX3
 TSR TSR3
 TSR3C
 TVR Moto3

125 cc class (1949–2011)
 Aprilia RS 125 R
 Aprilia RSW125
 Aprilia RSA125
 Bultaco 125
 ČZ 125
 ČZ 125 Twin
 Derbi 125 GP
 Derbi 125 V-Twin
 Gilera 125 GP
 Gilera Mosca Bianca 125
 Honda RC142
 Honda RC143
 Honda 2RC143
 Honda RC144
 Honda RC145
 Honda CR93
 Honda 2RC146
 Honda 4RC146
 Honda RC148
 Honda RC149
 Honda MT125R
 Honda RS125
 Honda RS125R
 Italjet F125
 Jawa 125 Twin
 KTM 125 FRR
 Loncin 125
 Lube 125
 Malaguti 125
 Maxtra 125
 Mondial 125SS
 Mondial 175 DOHC
 Morbidelli 125
 Motobécane 125
 Motobi 175
 Motobi 125
 MV Agusta 125 Motore Lungo
 MV Agusta 125 Bialbero
 MV Agusta 125 SOHC
 MV Agusta 125 Monoalbero
 MV Agusta 125 Disc Valve
 MZ RD 125 Triple
 MZ RE 125
 MZ RZ 125 Tandem
 Parilla 175 Production Racer
 Puch 125
 Suzuki 125 V4
 Yamaha RA41
 Yamaha RA75
 Yamaha RA97
 Yamaha 125 V4
 Yamaha RA31A
 Yamaha AS1
 Yamaha AS3
 Yamaha TA125
 Yamaha TZ125

80 cc class (1984–1989)
 Derbi 80
 HuVo-Casal 80
 Krauser 80
 Zündapp 80

50 cc class (1962–1983)

 Bultaco TSS 50
 Derbi 50
 Ducson 50
 Gilera 4
 Honda CR110
 Honda RC110
 Honda RC111
 Honda RC112
 Honda RC113
 Honda RC114
 Honda RC115
 Honda RC116
 Itom 50
 Jamathi 50
 Kreidler 50 GP
 Kreidler 50 Van Veen
 Monark 50
 Morbidelli 50
 MZ RE 50
 Suzuki 50 Single
 Suzuki 50 Twin
 Tomos D3
 Tomos D5
 Tomos D6
 Tomos D7
 Tomos D9
 Tomos DMPG
 Tomos DMPG GP75
 Tomos DMPG GP78
 Tomos DMPG GP79

MotoE class (2019–present)

 Energica Ego Corsa

Motorcycle sport lists
Lists of motorcycles